Jelena Kocić (born 1990) is a politician in Serbia. A member of the Serbian Progressive Party, she was awarded a mandate to serve in the National Assembly of Serbia on 10 March 2021.

Private career
Kocić holds a Bachelor of Laws degree. She lives in Donji Bunibrod in the municipality of Leskovac. She worked as deputy secretary of the city assembly of Leskovac during the 2016–20 term.

Politician
Kocić was elected as a vice-president of the Leskovac city board of the Progressive Party on 4 March 2019.

She received the 198th position on the Progressive Party's Aleksandar Vučić — For Our Children electoral list in the 2020 Serbian parliamentary election and missed direct election when the list won 188 out of 250 mandates. She was awarded a mandate on 10 March 2021 as a replacement for Žarko Mićin, who had resigned.

References

1990 births
Living people
Politicians from Leskovac
Members of the National Assembly (Serbia)
Serbian Progressive Party politicians
Women members of the National Assembly (Serbia)